Ruwanawella Bridge is an iron arch bridge built over the Gurugoda Oya, a tributary of the Kelani River, in Ruwanwella during the British colonial era. A new bridge is under construction in place of this bridge.

The bridge was formally recognised by the Government as an protected archaeological monument on 6 February 2009.

On 27 May 2011 Sri Lanka Post issued a Rs.15 stamp with a photograph of the bridge, as part of a set of stamps commemorating bridges and culverts in Sri Lanka.

See also
 Nine Arch Bridge, Demodara
 Mawanella Bridge

References

1944 establishments in Ceylon
Bridges completed in 1944
Bridges in Kegalle District
Archaeological protected monuments in Kegalle District